The Drexel University Dornsife School of Public Health is a part of the Drexel University Health Sciences network of schools. The Dornsife School of Public Health was located in downtown Philadelphia from its inception until December 2013. It has since re-located to the University City Campus.

The Dornsife School of Public Health was founded in 1996, with Jonathan Mann as its first dean. In 2000, the School came under the operational management of Drexel University and in 2002 fully joined the University's Health Sciences network, where it was physically located until early 2014 within the Center City Hahnemann Campus, alongside the Drexel University College of Medicine and the Drexel University College of Nursing and Health Professions. In mid-January 2014, the school moved into the renovated Nesbitt Hall building, located in the University City Campus. The building used to house the Antoinette Westphal College of Media Arts and Design. In September 2015, the School received a $45 million gift   from longtime philanthropists Dana and David Dornsife, in recognition of which the School was named after the donors.

Mission

Departments
The School's academic program contains the following four departments:
Community Health and Prevention (CHP)
Environmental and Occupational Health (EOH)
Epidemiology and Biostatistics (Epi/ Bio)
Health Management and Policy (HMP)

Degrees
The School currently offers the following Master's, Doctoral and Certificate degrees:
Master of Public Health (MPH)
Master of Public Health, Executive Program (Executive MPH)
Master of Science (MS) in Biostatistics
Master of Science (MS) in Epidemiology
Doctor of Public Health (DrPH) in Community Health & Prevention
Doctorate (PhD) in Epidemiology
DrPH in Health Policy and Social Justice
Joint Doctor of Medicine and Master of Public Health (MD/MPH)
Certificate in Epidemiology and Biostatistics

Centers and projects

Drexel Urban Health Collaborative (DUHC)
A.J. Drexel Autism Institute
Center for Public Health Readiness and Communication (CPHRC)
Center for Nonviolence and Social Justice
National Resource Center on Advancing Emergency Preparedness for Culturally Diverse Communities
Center for Hunger-Free Communities
Program for Lesbian, Gay, Bisexual and Transgender Health

References

External links

Schools of public health in the United States
Drexel University
Educational institutions established in 1996
Medical and health organizations based in Pennsylvania
1996 establishments in Pennsylvania